Doda is a surname of multiple origins.

People with this surname
 Bib Doda, 19th-century Albanian chieftain
 Anton Doda (c. 1680 – 1766), Albanian vice consul and merchant
 Carol Doda (1937–2015), American stripper
 Federico Seismit-Doda (1825–1893), Italian politician
 Haruna Doda (born 1975), Nigerian footballer
 Xhevdet Doda, Kosovan resistance fighter during World War II

See also
 Doda (disambiguation)

Albanian-language surnames